The Acanthoceratinae comprise a subfamily of ammonoid cephalopods that lived during the Late Cretaceous from the latter early Cenomanian to the late Turonian

Shells are evolute, tuberculate and ribbed, with subquadrate to squarish whorl section wherein tubercles typically dominate over ribs.  Derivation is from the Mantellicertinae in the early Cenomanian. Gave rise through Neocardioceras to the Mammitinae.

Genera
The following genera are included in the Acanthoceratinae according to various sources as indicated.

Acanthoceras Neumayer, 1875
Acompsoceras Hyatt, 1903 
Alzadites
Benueites Reyment, 1954
Calycoceras Hyatt, 1900 
Conlinoceras Cobban & Scott, 1972
Cunningtoniceras Collignon, 1937
Eucalycoceras Spath, 1923
Hypacanthohoplites Spath, 1923
Kastanoceras
Kennediella
Microsulcatoceras
Nebraskites Kennedy & Cobban, 1988
Neocardioceras Spath, 1926
Nigericeras Schneegan, 1943
Paraconlinoceras
Plesiacanthoceratoides
Prohauericeras
Protacanthoceras Spath, 1923
Pseudocalycoceras Thomel, 1969
Pseudovascoceras
Quitmaniceras Powell, 1963
Sumitomoceras
Tarrantoceras
Tunesites
Thomelites
Watinoceras Warren, 1930 (Watinoceras has also been classified under Mammitinae)

Distribution
Fossils of species within the Acanthoceratinae  have been found in Upper Cretaceous sediments in Angola, Antarctica, Australia, Brazil, Canada, Denmark, Egypt, France, Germany, Japan, Jordan, Madagascar, Mexico, Nigeria, Oman, Peru, Russia, Switzerland, United Kingdom, United States and Venezuela.

References
 W.J. Arkell, et al., 1957. Mesozoic Ammonoidea; Treatise on Invertebrate Paleontology, Part L. Geological Society of America and University of Kansas Press. 

Acanthoceratidae
Protostome subfamilies
Cenomanian first appearances
Turonian extinctions